Abed Gubi Nadir ( ‘Ābid al-Qūbī Nādir) is a fictional character on the NBC/Yahoo! Screen sitcom series Community, created by Dan Harmon and portrayed by Danny Pudi. Talkative, literal, and sometimes overly pedantic, Abed is a student at Greendale Community College and one of the first members of the study group essential to the series. He is a pop-culture enthusiast, with extensive knowledge of TV shows and movies, as well as a passion for filmmaking. Because of his knowledge of television tropes, Abed usually serves as the self-aware bridge between Community and the real world, often pointing out the motifs and precedents taking place in each episode, usually without breaking the fourth wall. Abed's unusual social behavior and special interests insinuate that he is on the autism spectrum, as suggested by Dan Harmon and stated by other characters on the show. He is generally beloved by members of the study group and enjoys a close bond with Troy Barnes (Donald Glover).

Concept and creation 

While writing the character of Abed, Community creator Dan Harmon realized through research that he might have autism spectrum disorder. He consulted a doctor about it and concluded that he himself is on the spectrum. Harmon had this to say on the matter on a podcast hosted by Kevin Pollak.

Character biography

Background
Abed Gubi Nadir is born to a Palestinian father from Gaza and a Polish American mother. His mother leaves the family when Abed is six years old, and he assumes his father blames him for it. This leads Abed to distance himself from his father and submerge himself in American pop culture, resulting in his extensive knowledge of film and TV. He is trilingual as he is fluent in English, Arabic, and Polish. Abed's father runs a falafel restaurant and initially only allows his son to take classes at Greendale that can help him take over the business one day. Abed later convinces his father (through a homemade film) to allow him to study film. In "Heroic Origins", it is revealed that Abed received a restraining order from a local theater for standing outside the theater and telling moviegoers not to watch Star Wars: The Phantom Menace, with two of the people he talked to being Shirley Bennett's (Yvette Nicole Brown) sons. He is also forced to attend therapy and during one of the sessions spots Annie Edison (Alison Brie) stealing a prescription pad. He then immediately informs the doctor, which likely leads to Annie being expelled from high school for her Adderall addiction.

Personality
Abed's straightforward attitude and lack of social skills leads some characters to believe that he has autism spectrum disorder. Among them is Jeff (Joel McHale), who says so in the pilot, although Abed has apparently never heard of the term until then.

Examples of his lack of social skills include failing to pick up emotional cues and sarcasm in conversations and his analytical approach to his friends, although he has shown the ability to have sympathy for his friends. At the end of season 3, Abed begins to participate in “therapy” sessions with Britta (Gillian Jacobs).

Because of his encyclopedic knowledge of TV and movie motifs, Abed usually compares situations faced by the characters to other shows by pointing out various storylines, character development, and dynamics taking place. His abilities even lead to him successfully predicting actions and situations made by his friends, as shown in "Debate 109". This allows Abed to serve as the self-conscious bridge between the show and its audience, and he makes numerous meta-references alluding to the show. For instance, he refers to the school years as "seasons", and he points out the events unfolding in "Cooperative Calligraphy" will lead to a bottle episode. He claims that his ability to recognize motifs stems from television's predictable nature and that he is simply using these motives to understand society and his friends better. Abed is also shown to be a skilled athlete, dancer, and singer. In the episode "Horror Fiction in Seven Spooky Steps", Abed is revealed (unbeknownst to the characters) to be the only member of the study group that does not have sociopathic tendencies according to the results of a psychological test. However, Jeff may or may not have sociopathic tendencies as well, as he admits to filling in the test randomly.

Interests and hobbies
Abed has a passion for filmmaking and often takes part in making documentaries about the lives of the characters, many of which are the subject of numerous episodes in the series. He enjoys role-playing characters such as Batman and setting up situations paying homage to films such as My Dinner With Andre ("Critical Film Studies"). However, his fondness of role-playing did land him in debt once, forcing him and other members of the study group to participate as celebrity impersonators ("Contemporary Impressionists").

Abed is a fan of the British sci-fi show Inspector Spacetime (a parody of Doctor Who) and often participates in its fandom along with Troy. The two would fantasize and play out sequences from the show inside their "Dreamatorium" until it was turned into their bedroom. He also enjoys watching the shows Cougar Town and The Cape, with Danny Pudi appearing in a cameo as Abed during the season 2 finale of Cougar Town.

In season 5, Abed returns to Greendale after a failed stint as a filmmaker and decides to re-enroll in classes to learn how to work with real people. In the series finale "Emotional Consequences of Broadcast Television", Abed reveals that he is moving to Los Angeles to work as a production assistant for a TV show.

Relationships with others
Abed generally gets along with members of the study group and the Save Greendale Committee, although his social ineptitude and certain actions sometimes annoy and frustrate the group. One example including when it is revealed during Pierce's will reading that Abed has installed tracking devices onto all members of the study group ("Cooperative Polygraphy"). 

Abed's closest friend in the study group is Troy. Although initially appearing to be at odds with each other, they gradually formed a close bond with each other. The two often appear during the credits of each episode doing various skits, with one noted recurring activity being the mock morning news program Troy and Abed in the Morning. After living with Pierce (Chevy Chase) during season 2, Troy moves in with Abed in season 3 and is later joined by Annie at Apartment 303. The two often partner for class assignments and numerous activities. However, the friendship is not without conflicts, as the two notably have a feud (and an eventual large scale pillow fight) over the construction of their pillow forts on campus in the episodes "Digital Exploration of Interior Design" and "Pillows and Blankets" until a truce is arranged by Jeff. During season 4, Abed is able to assist Troy in breaking off his relationship with Britta. In season 5, after Troy decides to leave Greendale to earn Pierce's fortune, Abed arranges for a school-wide game of 'the floor is lava' to send off Troy. After Troy departs, Abed struggles to adjust from his absence and deals with isolation. He is able to slowly learn to work with other people such as criminology professor Buzz Hickey (Jonathan Banks), but has a minor breakdown in "Basic Story" after realizing that there is no story of conflict at Greendale. By season 6, Abed has grown close to Annie and Britta, the latter of whom moves into their apartment. He also connects with Frankie Dart (Paget Brewster), the consultant hired to assist the Save Greendale Committee. He sometimes adopts alternate personalities that Annie is attracted to, as shown in the season 2 finale, 'For a Few Paintballs More'.

In "Herstory of Dance", Abed attempts to pull off a classic sitcom trope of balancing between two dates set up by Annie and Shirley during the corresponding Sadie Hawkins and Sophie B. Hawkins dances. He, however, falls instead for a coat check girl named Rachel (Brie Larson). Abed forgets about her until in season 5 and apologizes for his mistake and officially asks her out. Eventually, he even tries to get her to move into his apartment, causing tension between them. Though they reconcile by the end of the episode, they appear to have since broken up as Rachel is never seen or mentioned afterwards. This is lampshaded in the season 6 episode 'Ladders' when Abed remarks "what happened to that girl I was dating?"

Reception

Critical response
The character of Abed Nadir has received acclaim from critics and viewers alike and is generally considered to be one of the most popular characters in the series. In 2011, Paste ranked him at first in their list of the 20 Best TV Characters of 2011, describing him as "the show's emotional center" and saying "his pop-culture obsessions and antics with his buddy Troy have made for some of the show's finest moments." Emily VanDerWerff, who served as TV editor for The A.V. Club when Community originally aired, called Abed one of the most original characters of the decade and praised the show for finding "a different way to do a sitcom character."

The phrase "Six Seasons and a Movie", uttered by Abed when Jeff argues that The Cape will be canceled, became a rallying cry for the Community fanbase when the show was on the verge of being canceled itself.

Though the show never confirms if Abed is autistic, many critics have praised the show for its portrayal of Abed within that context and for allowing Abed to establish relationships and undergo character development nonetheless. When writing Abed's character in 2011, Dan Harmon discovered that he himself might actually be autistic as well. He later stated on a podcast with Kevin Pollak that he knew he was not normal, and that he discovered that "I had a lot more in common with Abed than I did with Jeff."

Awards and nominations
For his portrayal of Abed, Pudi has been nominated for several awards, including three Critics' Choice Television Awards for Best Supporting Actor in a Comedy Series, one TCA Award for Individual Achievement in Comedy, and three EWwy Awards for Best Supporting Actor in a Comedy (winning one in 2012).

References

Community (TV series) characters
Fictional college students
Fictional directors
Fictional characters on the autism spectrum
Fictional Arabs
Fictional Muslims
Fictional Polish-American people
Male characters in television
Television characters introduced in 2009